Syllepte kenrickalis is a moth of the family Crambidae that is found in Madagascar. It was described by Viette in 1960.

References

Moths described in 1960
kenrickalis
Moths of Madagascar